is a 2014 Japanese horror film starring Mariya Suzuki.

Cast
Mariya Suzuki
Momoko Kaechi
Mao Kanjo

See also
Kokkuri-san: Gekijoban

References

External links
 

2014 horror films
Japanese horror films
2014 films
2010s Japanese films